Kushkopala is a rural locality (a village) and the administrative center of Kushkopalsky Selsoviet of Pinezhsky District in Arkhangelsk Oblast, Russia, located on the left bank of the Pinega River. As of the 2010 Census, its population was 803.

There is a school and a kindergarten, some shops, a library, a club, a post office, an administrative building, a power-saw bench, and a logging enterprise in the village. Hunting and fishing are common. The majority of residents breed livestock and engage in gardening.

References

Notes

Sources

Rural localities in Pinezhsky District
Pinezhsky Uyezd